Aromobates nocturnus, the skunk frog, is a species of critically endangered frog endemic to Trujillo State in Venezuela. It is an extremely rare frog, and no sightings have been recorded since the original description in the early 1990s.

Description
Aromobates nocturnus has a noxious but non-toxic skin secretion with skunk-like odor. It is nocturnal and usually found swimming or sitting in water.

It is commonly believed that the Aromobates nocturnus is the sister group of the Dendrobatidae due to its unique characteristics including its larger size, nocturnal and aquatic nature, and the presence of the adductor mandibulae externus superficialis muscle most often found in other Dendrobatids. 

The male protects the eggs that are laid on land. After hatching, the male carries the tadpoles on his back to water where they develop further.

Habitat
The natural habitats of Aromobates nocturnus are small cold-water streams in cloud forests. The species is threatened by habitat loss caused by agriculture, involving both crops and livestock. It could also potentially be affected by disease, such as chytridiomycosis.

References

nocturnus
Amphibians of Venezuela
Endemic fauna of Venezuela
Amphibians described in 1991